An Dandara (born 8 April 1940) is a Cambodian sailor. He competed in the Star event at the 1964 Summer Olympics.

References

External links
 

1940 births
Living people
Cambodian male sailors (sport)
Olympic sailors of Cambodia
Sailors at the 1964 Summer Olympics – Star
Place of birth missing (living people)